In Tibetan cuisine, Qoiri is a stew of mutton chops, made with flour, shredded wheat, chillies, dry curd cheese, water and salt. The Moinba people of southwestern Tibet often add a stronger cheese and add further ingredients such as wild mushrooms and fungi.

See also
 List of stews
 List of Tibetan dishes

References

Tibetan stews